Michael Simko (born May 23, 1981) is an American professional racing driver. He has competed in the ARCA Racing Series from 2001 to 2012 with 17 top-10's. He is the son of former NASCAR Winston Cup Series driver David Simko.

Racing career

In 2001, Simko would make his ARCA Re/Max Series debut at Toledo Speedway driving the No. 96 Chevrolet, finishing 20th after starting 12th. In 2002, he would make three more starts, one for Bob Schacht at Toledo, one for his own team at Winchester Speedway, and one for Arne Henriksen at Salem Speedway. He would finish sixth at Toledo and Salem respectively. For 2003, he would run five races, finishing eighth at Kentucky Speedway driving for Mark Gibson.

In 2004, he would make seven starts, with six of those starts coming with Schacht, and one coming with Greg Sarff at Chicagoland Speedway, where he would finish seventh. In the following year, he would run 13 of the 23 races of the schedule driving the No. 45 entry for father David Simko. His best finish would come in his last start of the year at Salem, where he would lead 39 laps to finish third in the race. In 2006, he would solely run in a Chevrolet, and would get four top-10's, including a best finish of fourth at Winchester.

Fight and suspension
On September 26, ten days after his last ARCA start of 2006 at Salem, Simko was involved in a crash with Don St. Denis on the 112th lap of the Great Lakes Chevy Dealers/Budweiser Glass City 200 at Toledo Speedway. After the crash, Simko climbed out of his car and ran over to St. Denis, who was unable to shut off his car at the time due to a piece of plexiglass that fell by the ignition switch, and made a running jump and landed both feet into the windshield of St. Denis' car. Afterwards, Simko would throw his helmet at St. Denis' car and walk away. St Denis would then get out of the car and run over to Simko in the infield of the track where the two engaged in a fist-fight with several punches being thrown as race officials tried to break up the fight. Since the series that hosted the event was sanctioned by ARCA, both Simko and St. Denis were suspended indefinitely from all ARCA-sanctioned events. Both Simko and St. Denis would later apologize for said incident and were later reinstated.

Racing return
In 2007, Simko would make his ARCA Re/Max Series return at Salem driving the No. 75 Chevrolet for Bob Schacht Motorsports, where he would finish sixth after starting eleventh. He would make another start that year at Toledo, where he would finish third. He would run three more races with the team in 2008, getting a best finish of 11th at Toledo. Simko would drive the No. 27 Chevrolet for Don DeWitt for three races, finishing tenth at Chicagoland Speedway. He would make three more starts for DeWitt over the next two seasons, finishing in the top ten at Berlin Raceway in 2010 and 2011 with eighth and ninth respectively. In 2012, he would run two races, finishing 17th at Iowa Speedway with Hendren Motorsports in the No. 41 Chevrolet, and 14th at Berlin with Venturini Motorsports in the No. 35 Toyota. The latter event would be his most recent ARCA start.

Since his last ARCA start, Simko has recently competed in the CRA Super Series and the CRA Jegs All-Stars Tour.

Motorsports results

ARCA Racing Series
(key) (Bold – Pole position awarded by qualifying time. Italics – Pole position earned by points standings or practice time. * – Most laps led.)

References

1981 births
Living people
NASCAR drivers
ARCA Menards Series drivers
Racing drivers from Michigan
People from Clarkston, Michigan